S.R. Wojdak & Associates, LP (commonly known as Wojdak & Associates) is a lobbying firm in Pennsylvania.

Wojdak & Associates was among the first lobbying firms to bring "contract lobbying" to Harrisburg. Today, it is one of the "largest and most influential lobbying firms" in the state.

The Pennsylvania Report said that the firm is "widely known to bring home the funds" for clients. The Pittsburgh Post-Gazette described Wojdak & Associates as "one of the biggest and best-known firms in the state." In 2002, Wojdak & Associates was part of a controversy in suburban Philadelphia over its lobbying on behalf of red light cameras. During the 2009 Pennsylvania budget impasse, Philadelphia Mayor Michael Nutter controversially extended its lobbying contract with Wojdak & Associates after it expired.

In 2000, Wojdak & Associates' Martin D. Sellers and David S. Feinberg founded Sellers, Feinberg and Associates, a  lobbying firm to specialize in health-related lobbying.

References

Lobbying firms based in Pennsylvania
Organizations based in Harrisburg, Pennsylvania